The politics of the Republic of Korea take place in the framework of a presidential representative democratic republic, whereby the president is the head of state, and of a multi-party system. To ensure a separation of powers, the Republic of Korea Government is made up of three branches: legislative, executive, and judicial. The government exercises executive power and legislative power is vested in both the government and the National Assembly. The judiciary is independent of the executive and the legislature and comprises a Supreme Court, appellate courts, and a Constitutional Court. 

Since 1948, the constitution has undergone five major revisions, each signifying a new republic. The current Sixth Republic began with the last major constitutional revision that took effect in 1988. From its founding until the June Democratic Struggle, the South Korean political system operated under an military authoritarian regime, with the freedom of assembly, association, expression, press and religion as well as civil society activism being tightly restricted. During that period, there were no freely elected national leaders, political opposition is suppressed, dissent was not permitted and civil rights were curtailed.

National government

Executive branch

|President
|Yoon Suk-yeol
|People Power Party
|10 May 2022
|-
|Prime Minister
|Han Duck-soo
|Independent
|22 May 2022
|}

The head of state is the president, who is elected by direct popular vote for a single five-year term. The president is Commander-in-Chief of the Republic of Korea Armed Forces and enjoys considerable executive powers.

The president appoints the prime minister with approval of the National Assembly, as well as appointing and presiding over the State Council of chief ministers as the head of government. On 12 March 2004, the executive power of then President Roh Moo-hyun was suspended when the Assembly voted to impeach him and Prime Minister Goh Kun became an Acting President. On 14 May 2004, the Constitutional Court overturned the impeachment decision made by the Assembly and Roh was reinstated.

On 10 May 2022, Yoon Suk-yeol succeeded Moon Jae-in as president of South Korea.

Legislative branch

The National Assembly (gukhoe) has 300 members, elected for a four-year term, 253 members in single-seat constituencies and 47 members by proportional representation. The ruling Democratic Party of Korea is the largest party in the Assembly.

Judicial branch

The South Korean judiciary is independent of the other two branches of government, and is composed of two different highest courts. Inferior ordinary courts are under the Supreme Court, whose justices are appointed by the president of South Korea with the consent of the National Assembly. In addition, the Constitutional Court oversees questions of constitutionality, as single and the only court whose justices are appointed by the president of South Korea by equal portion of nomination from the president, the National Assembly, and the Supreme Court Chief justice. South Korea has not accepted compulsory ICJ jurisdiction.

Political parties and elections

South Korea elects on national level a head of state – the president – and a legislature. The president is elected for a five-year term by the people. The National Assembly (Gukhoe) has 300 members, elected for a four-year term, 253 members in single-seat constituencies and 47 members by proportional representation.

The main two political parties in South Korea are the liberal Democratic Party of Korea (lit. "Together Democratic Party", DPK) and the conservative People Power Party (PPP), formerly the United Future Party (UFP). The liberal camp and the conservative camp are the dominant forces of South Korean politics at present.

Political nature
South Korea's political history has always been prone to splits from and merges with other parties. One reason is that there is a greater emphasis around the 'politics of the individual'  rather than the party; therefore, party loyalty is not strong when disagreements occur. The graph below illustrates the extent of the political volatility within the last 10 years alone. These splits were intensified after the 2016 South Korean political scandal.

Latest elections

Presidential election

In March 2022, Yoon Suk-yeol, the candidate of the conservative opposition People Power Party, won a close election over Democratic Party candidate Lee Jae-myung by the narrowest margin ever. On 10 May 2022, Yoon was sworn in as South Korea's new president.

Legislative election

Political pressure groups and leaders
 Federation of Korean Industries
 Federation of Korean Trade Unions
 Korean Confederation of Trade Unions
 Korean National Council of Churches
 Korean Traders Association
 Korean Veterans' Association
 National Council of Labor Unions
 National Democratic Alliance of Korea
 National Federation of Farmers' Associations
 National Federation of Student Associations

Administrative divisions

One Special City (Teukbyeolsi, Capital City), six Metropolitan Cities (Gwangyeoksi, singular and plural), nine Provinces (Do, singular and plural) and one Special Autonomous City (Sejong City).
 Seoul Teukbyeolsi (서울특별시)
 Busan Gwangyeoksi (부산광역시)
 Daegu Gwangyeoksi (대구광역시)
 Incheon Gwangyeoksi (인천광역시)
 Daejeon Gwangyeoksi (대전광역시)
 Gwangju Gwangyeoksi (광주광역시)
 Ulsan Gwangyeoksi (울산광역시)
 Gyeonggi-do (경기도)
 Gangwon-do (강원도)
 Chungcheongbuk-do (충청북도)
 Chungcheongnam-do (충청남도)
 Jeollabuk-do (전라북도)
 Jeollanam-do (전라남도)
 Gyeongsangbuk-do (경상북도)
 Gyeongsangnam-do (경상남도)
 Jeju Teukbyeoljachi-do (제주특별자치도)
 Sejong Teukbyeol-jachisi (세종특별자치시)

Foreign relations 

South Korea is a member of the AfDB, APEC, AsDB, BIS, CP, EBRD, ESCAP, FAO, G-77, IAEA, IBRD, ICAO, ICCt, ICC, ICRM, IDA, IEA (observer), IFAD, IFC, IFRCS, IHO, ILO, IMF, IMO, Inmarsat, Intelsat, Interpol, IOC, IOM, ISO, ITU, ITUC, MINURSO, NAM (guest), NSG, OAS (observer), OECD, OPCW, OSCE (partner), UN, UNCTAD, UNESCO, UNIDO, UNMOGIP, UNOMIG, UNU, UPU, WCO, WHO, WIPO, WMO, WToO, WTrO, and the Zangger Committee.

See also
 Conservatism in South Korea
 Liberalism in South Korea
 Progressivism in South Korea
 Political scandals in South Korea

References

External links

 South Korea at The World Factbook
 Office of the President
 National Assembly

 

pt:Coreia do Sul#Política